Chris Sexton (born August 3, 1971) is a former Major League Baseball player who played for the Colorado Rockies and the Cincinnati Reds. He was drafted by the Cincinnati Reds in the 10th round of the 1993 amateur draft but made it to the big leagues with the Rockies after being traded for Marcus Moore in 1995. He made his debut on May 3, 1999 against the Chicago Cubs. He played in 35 games that year filling in at center field, left field, right field, second base, and shortstop. The following year he was back with the Reds and he again played in 35 games as a utility infielder. Chris is a 1989 graduate of St. Xavier High School in Cincinnati and currently a resident of Cincinnati, Ohio.

References

External links

Living people
Cincinnati Reds players
Colorado Rockies players
Major League Baseball shortstops
Major League Baseball third basemen
Major League Baseball left fielders
Major League Baseball second basemen
Major League Baseball right fielders
Major League Baseball center fielders
St. Xavier High School (Ohio) alumni
1971 births
Miami RedHawks baseball players
Baseball players from Cincinnati
Billings Mustangs players
Charleston Wheelers players
Colorado Springs Sky Sox players
Louisville Bats players
Louisville RiverBats players
New Haven Ravens players
Salem Avalanche players
Winston-Salem Warthogs players